The Yent Mound (8FR5) is a Santa Rosa-Swift Creek culture archaeological site located on Alligator Harbor west of St. Teresa, Florida. It is on the east side of County Road 370, approximately 2.5 miles from the junction of U.S. Route 98. On May 24, 1973, it was added to the U.S. National Register of Historic Places.

The Yent Mound was constructed by people of the Deptford culture around the beginning of the Current Era. William Sears defined the archaeological Yent complex based on artifacts found in the Yent Mound, Pierce Mound and Crystal River Mounds. The Yent complex was related to the Hopewell tradition, and some of the artifacts were trade items from the Hopewell area.

See also
 List of burial mounds in the United States

References

External links
 Franklin County listings at National Register of Historic Places
 Franklin County listings at Florida's Office of Cultural and Historical Programs
 Alligator Harbor Aquatic Preserve at Florida's Department of Environmental Protection
 Chapter 4. NORTHWEST FLORIDA, 2500 B.P.-A.D. 1000

Swift Creek culture
Woodland period
Geography of Franklin County, Florida
Archaeological sites on the National Register of Historic Places in Florida
Mounds in Florida
National Register of Historic Places in Franklin County, Florida